The 2013 Summit League baseball tournament took place from May 23 through 26. The top four regular season finishers of the league's five eligible teams met in the double-elimination tournament held at Oakland University Baseball Field in Rochester, Michigan. Nebraska–Omaha was not eligible.  claimed their first tournament championship and earned the Summit League's automatic bid to the 2013 NCAA Division I baseball tournament.

Seeding
The top four finishers from the regular season were seeded one through four based on conference winning percentage. The teams then played a double elimination tournament. Nebraska–Omaha, in its first year in the Summit League and second at the Division I level, was not eligible for the tournament due to NCAA reclassification rules.

Results

All-Tournament Team
The following players were named to the All-Tournament Team.

Most Valuable Player
Daniel Telford of South Dakota State was named Tournament Most Valuable Player, recording a pair of doubles and driving in the only run of the championship game.

References

Summit League Baseball Tournament
The Summit League baseball tournament
Tournament
Summit League baseball tournament
Baseball in Michigan
Sports in Oakland County, Michigan